My Brother Cicero is a 1998 comedy short film written by Louis Mandylor and Tony Nittoli starring Louis Mandylor, Costas Mandylor and Tony Nittoli. Filmed in Hollywood, it garnered two independent film awards and generated mostly positive reviews from critics.

Plot
The harsh tale of an abusive relationship between a man and his cat - who steals his women and drugs, kills his mobster boss, and altogether terrorizes him.

Cast
 Costas Mandylor as Cicero 
 Louis Mandylor as Nicky 
 Tony Nittoli as Jimmy the Cat

Crew
 Producer Louis Mandylor
 Director: Tony Nittoli
 Writers: Tony Nittoli & Louis Mandylor

Awards
 1998 Best Independent Film at Societes des Auteurs award at the Brussels Independent Film Festival
 1999 Best Short Film at the New York Underground Film Festival

References

External links
 
 

1998 films
1998 short films
American short films
1990s English-language films